Mike McGuire (born July 21, 1979) is an American politician serving as a member of the California State Senate from the 2nd district, which encompasses the North Coast region, from Marin County to Del Norte County. Since January 19, 2022 he has served as Majority Leader of the Senate replacing Robert Hertzberg, he previous served as Assistant Majority Leader from December 2018 to his appointment as majority leader . Prior to being elected to the State Senate in 2014, he was a member of the Sonoma County Board of Supervisors and served as Mayor of Healdsburg, California.

Early life and education

Mike McGuire comes from a family of farmers, specializing in grape and prune farming for over 50 years. In 1998, he became the youngest person ever elected to the Healdsburg School Board at age 19. He attended Sonoma State University in Rohnert Park, California, receiving a Bachelor of Arts in political science in 2002.

Career 
After working for a military defense contractor (General Dynamics), McGuire was elected to the Healdsburg City Council in 2004, where he spent six years, including time as the city's youngest mayor. In 2010, he became a member of the Sonoma County Board of Supervisors. In 2014, McGuire ran for the California State Senate to succeed Democratic Senator Noreen Evans, who decided not to seek reelection.  McGuire easily defeated Republican candidate Lawrence Weisner for the District 2 State Senate seat that year, winning 70% of the vote.

In April 2015, he introduced bill SB 643, with the purpose of legalizing and regulating the medical marijuana industry. The regulation would cover cultivation to consumption. McGuire criticized the state's lack of rules and regulations for medical marijuana, and was opposed to the Adult Use of Marijuana Act (Proposition 64). In September 2017, he was part of the state's legislative session that urged Congress to censure the president Donald Trump.

In September 2018, the bill he introduced to establish a statewide protocol for emergency alerts for all 58 California counties was signed into a law. In December 2018, he was selected to serve as assistant majority leader of the California Senate. In early January 2019, Mike McGuire "applauded" Gavin Newsom's 2019 budget plan for California. That same month, when president Donald Trump threatened to withhold government emergency fundings for the wildfires because of poor forest management by the state of California, Mike McGuire replied in a tweet that most California forests affected are managed by the federal government and not the state.

In 2019, he co-authored California Senate Bill 27 (SB27) officially named Tax Transparency Bill which was signed into law by Governor Gavin Newsom on July 30, 2019. He authored a bill that established the Great Redwood Trail as a proposed rail-to-trail project in Northern California.

Elections

2004 Healdsburg City Council Election

2008 Healdsburg City Council Election

2010 Sonoma County Board of Supervisors 4th district election

2014 State Senate Election

2018 State Senate Election

References

External links 

 
 
 

1979 births
21st-century American politicians
California city council members
County supervisors in California
Democratic Party California state senators
Living people
Mayors of places in California
People from Healdsburg, California
Sonoma State University alumni